Khan Jalaluddin Khan (Urdu: جلال الدین, 3 March 1901 – 21 January 1981), aka Jalal Baba (Urdu: جلال بابا), was a Muslim League stalwart and a Pakistan movement activist who served as the 8th Interior Minister of Pakistan under the Premiership of Feroz Khan Noon.

Early life
Born in Abbottabad, Hazara, Jalaluddin started his career as a driver for the British and rose to become a leading transporter. He joined the All-India Muslim League in 1935 and in 1939 K.B. Jalal Baba was elected as the president of the Hazara District Muslim League. He held office as an unopposed president for fourteen years and remained the President until 1953. The Muslim League gained strength of popularity in Hazara under his apt leadership.

The government was highly impressed by the qualities of leadership displayed by Jalal Baba in Hazara and Sarhad Province. Hence, to win his support allegiance, the Viceroy of India conferred upon him, first the title Khan Sahib, then after some time that of Khan Bahadur. These were highly coveted titles and regarded as marks of great distinction and pride. But Jalal Baba never prided himself as being a British titleholder. When the occasion demanded, he was the first to renounce his titles. He was among the first ones to renounce his titles given by the British in 1946 and was widely regarded as the "Winner of Referendum" in 1947.

The future of any other political party in Hazara besides the Muslim League remained bleak due to the influence of K.B. Jalal Baba. He was a Muslim Leaguer first and last. It is an undeniable fact, that the people of Hazara in the Sarhad Province, who were at present divided and have lost their prestige and political awareness, were united under the green flag of the Muslim League. The courageous leadership of Jalal Baba had brought people with divergent and conflicting views and representing different castes such as Dhond, Tanoli, Pathan, Syed, Awan, Swati, and Tareen, etc. together. He played a vital role in unifying these scattered groups into one. Consequently, the Hazara Muslim League was made a stone citadel and a stronghold of the All India Muslim League.

His father Sheikh Ghulam Mohammad was a blacksmith who had migrated to this part of undivided India in the band of Mujahedeen under the banner of Syed Ahmad Barelvi before the 1857 War of Independence. Khan Jalaluddin was brought up in a middle-class family of Abbottabad. Before matriculation, he left his school in 1919, and joined the 'Hijrat Movement' of protest emigration and left for Kabul, Afghanistan. He came back to Hazara from Landi Kotal after the movement was called off.

Political career
Jalal Baba had a prominent position among the Muslim League workers who offered the founder of Pakistan Muhammad Ali Jinnah sincere support and remained loyal to him till the end of the Pakistan movement.

Jalal Baba was among the first ones to initiate the 'Direct Action' in the struggle for Pakistan by moving a resolution in the All-India Muslim League meeting in July 1946, recommending the renunciation of titles, conferred by the British Government.

Again when in July 1947, the Muslim League launched the civil disobedience movement, Jalal Baba was among the first ones to court arrest from Hazara followed by others in such large numbers that the jails were filled to capacity with the political internees. He was released from jail only after the declaration of independence and the establishment of Pakistan on 14 August 1947.

It was not before the late 1930s that Jalal Baba had established himself as a recognized businessman and a social worker of Hazara. Now he could afford to enter the field of politics. Jalal Baba joined the Muslim League in 1937, at Abbottabad in the first public meeting held at the Company Bagh, while Chaudhry Khaliquzzaman accompanied by Saadullah Khan was presiding over the meeting. His political efforts led to his nickname 'Jalal Baba' (which means an elder, wise man, or expert in the local Hindko language ) and he was elected Hazara District President in 1940. He held the office for almost 21 years.

Jalal Baba, by now an eminent figure in the provincial political circles, raised his voice at the most crucial juncture. The reorganization of the Muslim League resulted in a big change in the political ranks of British Indians. The seeds of the Hazara branch of the Muslim League were sown by him. He further nourished it. After joining the Muslim League, he emerged as the league's leader in Hazara. He held the office as unopposed president for twenty-one years. The Hazara Muslim League acquired great strength and popularity under his leadership. He had also been the vice-president of the Provincial Muslim League and a member of the All-India Muslim League Council.

When the British Government conferred titles on Jalal Baba, the Muslim League was in the initial stages of taking root in the N.W.F.P Province. In view of his personal influence in his native Abbottabad area, the Muslim League leaders assigned Jalal Baba the task of its organization there. He received support and co-operation from the middle and lower-middle-class people who then comprised the majority of the local population, as he himself had belonged to them. People gathered around him and turned his transport office into a political office. From all over Hazara, the Muslim League workers used to visit him in order to receive his directives on organizational matters.

Hazara Muslim League
From the early 1930s onwards, the people of Hazara gradually became active in the freedom movement for an independent Pakistan under the active leadership of renowned All India Muslim League leaders such as Abdul Majid Khan Tarin of Talokar (1877–1939), an early member of the (then) Frontier Legislative Assembly, and others. Even before the All-India Muslim League, started its movement for Pakistan in 1937, after the historic Lucknow Session of October that year, the Hazara Muslim League was properly formed and convened at the residence of Noor-Ud-Din Qureshi in Abbottabad in 1936. In this meeting, the leaders of the All-India Muslim League, Nawab Bahadur Yar Jang, Maulana Shaukat Ali, Hamid Badayuni, and others came from India. The local people joined the movement in large numbers. In the 1939 elections for the Hazara Muslim League, Khan Jalaluddin Khan was elected as the President of the Hazara Muslim League. During the final phase of the movement for the creation of Pakistan, Captain Sardar Zain Muhammad Khan, OBI, and Khan Jalaluddin Jalal Baba defeated their Congress rivals in the elections of 1946 from their respective rural and urban Constituencies and politically routed the All India Congress from the region. In the Delhi Convention of Muslim League parliamentarians chaired by Muhammad Ali Jinnah, which finally voted for the division of India and the creation of Pakistan, Capt. Sardar Zain Muhammad Khan represented Hazara. These Muslim League Leaders were also able to mobilize the people of this area in favor of the referendum for the creation of Pakistan.

Sometime before the independence of Pakistan in 1947, Nawab Muhammad Farid Khan Tanoli (KBE) of Amb State also developed good relations with Jinnah and Nawabzada Liaqat Ali Khanas a politic move. His correspondence and letters to and from Jinnah are available in Pakistan's archival records

Referendum in NWFP
Jalal-ud-Din Khan's services during the Pakistan movement were too numerous to be recounted. He staked all his belongings for the achievement of Pakistan. After the Direct Action of 1946, the movement for Pakistan entered a crucial stage. In NWFP, the Red Shirt Leaders were blowing their own trumpet. They raised the "Pukhtoonistan" slogan, backed by Russia, Afghanistan and India. NWFP was the stronghold of the Congress Party and it had also gained some influence locally after the 1946 provincial elections. So it started creating some trouble regarding the future of the Muslims of this Province. In order to decide whether NWFP should form part of the dominion of India or Pakistan, a referendum was held by the British government.
On 18 June 1947, Muhammad Ali Jinnah set up a Commission to see that the cause of the Muslim League was upheld successfully in the upcoming Referendum. He himself was the Chairman of the commission. The other members of the commission were I.I. Chundrigar, Raja Ghazanfar Ali Khan, Khan Jalaluddin Khan Jalal Baba, Raja Haider Zaman, and Sardar Bahadur Khan. The Referendum lasted from 6 July 1947 to 17 July 1947. Jalal Baba worked from dawn to dusk for the Referendum, provided funds, and, being a transporter and transport contractor, used his transport for this purpose.

In NWFP, 90 percent of the votes cast were polled in favor of Pakistan. However, the Red Shirt Party (later named National Awami Party) boycotted the referendum. From Hazara alone, 99% of the Muslim votes were cast in favor of Pakistan. Almost thirty percent of the total votes polled were from Hazara.
Inayat-ur-Rahman Khan Abbasi  quoted:
"Khan Bahadur Jalal-ud-Din Khan was undoubtedly an organization in himself. Keeping in view his loyalty and services towards the country and the nation he deserved to be buried near Quaid-i-Azam’s Tomb. He was a veteran leader of the sub-continent in general and of NWFP in particular. It is not wrong to call him the Winner of the Referendum".

Jalal Baba Auditorium

In Abbottabad, Pakistan, there is a Jalal Baba Auditorium spanning an area of 8.75 acres, built with a cost of Rs 27.5 million, in recognition of his services to Pakistan. This auditorium has a seating capacity of 500 to 700 people.

References

External links
Discussion videoclip about Jalal Baba on Geo News Khabarnak TV show - YouTube
Jalal Baba's Official Page on Facebook
Radio Pakistan Documentary

1901 births
1981 deaths
All India Muslim League members
Interior ministers of Pakistan
People from Abbottabad
Hindkowan people
Pakistan Movement activists from the North-West Frontier Province